Acuerdate De Mi in English Remember Me was released as a promotional single from the band Selena y Los Dinos in 1986. Acuerdate De Mi was written by A.B. Quintanilla. "Acuerdate De Mi" was the fourth and last released single from Selena's third studio released album And the Winner Is.... Acuerdate De Mi was sung by other artists before and after Selena recorded "Acuerdate De Mi".

Covers
Trio La Rosa (1997; 2002)
Banda el Recodo (2002)
Parches (1995)
Los Freddy's (1996)
Pancho Barraza (2001)

References

1987 singles
Selena songs
Songs written by A. B. Quintanilla
Song recordings produced by A. B. Quintanilla
Song recordings produced by Bebu Silvetti
1986 songs